William Edwards Huntington (July 30, 1844 – December 6, 1930) was an American university dean and president.

He was born at Hillsboro, Illinois, served as private and first lieutenant in the Wisconsin Infantry in 1864–1865, and was educated at the University of Wisconsin–Madison (A.B., 1870) and at Boston University (B.D., 1873; Ph.D., 1881), where he was dean of the College of Liberal Arts from 1884 to 1904, president of the university in 1904–1911, and dean of the graduate department after 1911. In early life he was a Methodist minister, having been ordained in 1868, and he held pastorates in Massachusetts at Nahant (1870–1871), Roslindale (1872–1874), Newton (1875–1876), Cambridge (1877–1879), and Boston (1880–1882).

References

1844 births
1930 deaths
Presidents of Boston University
Boston University faculty
People from Massachusetts
Boston University School of Theology alumni
People from Hillsboro, Illinois
People of Wisconsin in the American Civil War
Union Army officers
University of Wisconsin–Madison alumni
19th-century American Methodist ministers
Methodists from Massachusetts